Nicola Perusco (died 1582) was a Roman Catholic prelate who served as Bishop of Civita Castellana e Orte (1565–1582).

Biography
Nicola Perusco was born in Rome, Italy.
On 7 Feb 1565, he was appointed during the papacy of Pope Pius IV as Bishop of Civita Castellana e Orte.
He served as Bishop of Civita Castellana e Orte until his death on 8 Feb 1582.

Episcopal succession
While bishop, he was the principal co-consecrator of:
Ortensio Battisti, Bishop of Veroli (1567);
Aurelio Griani, Bishop of Lettere-Gragnano (1570); and
Giovanni Domenico Rebiba, Bishop of Ortona (1570).

References

External links and additional sources
 (for Chronology of Bishops) 
 (for Chronology of Bishops) 

16th-century Italian Roman Catholic bishops
Bishops appointed by Pope Pius IV
1582 deaths